Steffen Zacharias (April 11, 1927 – June 6, 1989) was a German-born Greek American character actor known for his roles in films and television in America and Italy.

Biography
Born in Germany to Greek parents, Zacharias grew up in the United States, where he worked in New York City as a stage director, before making his acting debut in The Reporter. He migrated to Italy in 1967, and quickly gained a reputation as a reliable performer of character roles in genre films, including several appearances alongside Terence Hill and Bud Spencer. In the late 1970s, he went back to the U.S., where he continued to play occasional supporting roles until his death from cancer in 1989.

Partial filmography

 Gammera the Invincible (1966) - Sen. Billings
 Catch as Catch Can (1967) - Police Inspector
 Italian Secret Service (1968) - Dr. Wollenkampf (uncredited)
 Sardinia Kidnapped (1968) - Santulus Surgiu
 Ace High (1968) - Harold
 Colpo di stato (1969) - George Bradis
 Machine Gun McCain (1969) - Abe Stilberman
 The Five Man Army (1969) - Poker Player (uncredited)
 Under the Sign of Scorpio (1969) - The old islander
 Beatrice Cenci (1969) - Prospero Fadinacco
 The Kremlin Letter (1970) - Dittomachine
 Metello (1970) - Pallesi
 A Man Called Sledge (1970) - Red - Prison Guard
 L'asino d'oro: processo per fatti strani contro Lucius Apuleius cittadino romano (1970) - Milone
 A Pocketful of Chestnuts (1970)
 They Call Me Trinity (1970) - Jonathan
 Terrible Day of the Big Gundown (1971) - Gregory
 The Blonde in the Blue Movie (1971) - Bosen, the producer
 Vengeance Is a Dish Served Cold (1971) - Doc
 Return of Sabata (1971) - Donovan
 Man of the East (1972) - Man with Coach
 Man of La Mancha (1972) - Muleteer
 The Sicilian Connection (1972) - Sally
 Even Angels Eat Beans (1973) - Gerace
 The Infamous Column (1973) - Stefano Baruello
 The Violent Professionals (1973) - Monsomerda
 Revolver (1973) - Joe Le Corse
 Seven Hours of Violence (1973) - Fastikopoulos
 Mean Frank and Crazy Tony (1973) - Lawyer (uncredited)
 What Have They Done to Your Daughters? (1974) - Prof. Beltrame (uncredited)
 Street Law (1974) - Attorney Friend of Carlo's (uncredited)
 Mondo candido (1975) - Il saggio
 W.C. Fields and Me (1976) - Dr. Zahn (uncredited)
 The Winds of Kitty Hawk (1978, TV Movie) - Fisherman
 The Frisco Kid (1979) - Herschel Rosensheine
 The Girl, the Gold Watch & Everything (1980, TV Movie) - Old Man
 Death Wish II (1982) - Dr. Clark
 The Ice Pirates (1984) - Prisoner
 Exterminator 2 (1984) - Pop
 Irreconcilable Differences (1984) - Man at Party

References

Sources

External links

20th-century American male actors
American male film actors
German people of Greek descent
American people of Greek descent
1927 births
1989 deaths